The 2016–17 Eredivisie Vrouwen was the seventh season of the Netherlands women's professional football league. The season took place from 2 September 2016 to 26 May 2017 with eight teams. Defending champions FC Twente finished runners-up behind Ajax, who won their first Dutch championship.

Teams

On 16 June 2016, Achilles '29 was confirmed as the eighth team of the season.

Source: Soccerway

Format
At the regular season, the eight teams play each other three times, for a total of 21 matches each. After that the top four teams qualify for a championship play-off and the bottom four teams play a placement play-off. Teams play each other twice within its play-off group, for a total of 6 matches. Points accumulated at the regular season are halved and added to the points of the play-off stage rounds. The champion will qualify to the UEFA Women's Champions League.

Regular season

Standings

Results

Play-offs

Championship
The top four were set after matchday 18. Points of the first stage were halved.
Standings

Results

Placement
The bottom four were set after matchday 18. Points of the first stage were halved.
Standings

Results

Top scorers

Overall

Source: vrouwenvoetbalnederland.nl

Regular season

.

Play-offs

Championship group
.

Placement group
.

References

External links
 Official website
 Season on soccerway.com

Ned
1
2016–17